The 1996–97 Japan Figure Skating Championships were the 65th edition of the event. They were held on January 13–15, 1997 in Nagano. National Champions were crowned in the disciplines of men's singles, ladies' singles, and ice dancing. As well as crowning the national champions of Japan for the 1996–97 season, the results of this competition were used to help pick the teams for the 1997 World Championships.

Results

Men

Ladies

Ice dancing

External links
 1996–97 Japan Figure Skating Championships results

Japan Figure Skating Championships
1997 in figure skating
1997 in Japanese sport